Edward Mack (1826–1882), also known as E. Mack, was a German-American composer known mainly for his military march music.

Mack composed the music for I'll Give to You a Paper of Pins (1869), with the lyrics credited to "A Lady".  He also composed the waltz That Young Man Across the Way (1874).

Mack also composed music that celebrated the early popularity of bicycles, including The Velocipede Gallop and The Cyclopede Waltz.

References

Bibliography

External links
19th-Century California Sheet Music
Keffer Collection of Sheet Music

 Works by Edward Mack at Internet Archive

1826 births
1882 deaths
American male composers
19th-century American composers
19th-century American male musicians